Christopher W. Rector (born July 12, 1951) is an American politician and entrepreneur. Rector served as a Republican State Senator from Maine's 22nd District, representing much of Knox County, including Rockland and his residence in Thomaston. He graduated from the Boston University College of General Studies and earned a Bachelor of Arts from the University of Southern Maine. He attended the Kennedy School of Government at Harvard University in 2006 on a Brooks Fellowship. He served in the Maine House of Representatives from 2002 to 2006. He served as Chairman of the Joint Standing Committee on Labor, Commerce, Research, and Economic Development, and also served on the Joint Standing Committee on Energy, Utilities, and Technology and Joint Select Committee on Regulatory Reform. He serves on the Community Preservation Advisory Committee, the Maine Economic Growth Council, and the board of the Maine Compact for Higher Education. He is co-chair of Maine Solutions, a consensus-building training and facilitation group for legislators and public officials. He helped to develop the Midcoast Leadership Academy, which offered classes in leadership development. He was appointed to and has served on the Joint Select Committee on Research, Development, and the Innovation Economy in the summer of 2006 the Joint Select Committee on Prosperity in the summer of 2007, and the Joint Select Committee on Maine's Energy Future in the winter of 2009.

In 1999, Rector became a firefighter in his hometown of Thomaston.

Since January 2001, Rector has served as  "Regional Representative for United States Senator Angus King working in the Augusta, Maine office. His self-described region  is "the coast of Maine from the Sheepscot River to Calais."

References

1951 births
Living people
Politicians from Needham, Massachusetts
People from Thomaston, Maine
Businesspeople from Maine
Republican Party Maine state senators
Republican Party members of the Maine House of Representatives
Boston University alumni
University of Southern Maine alumni
21st-century American politicians